Distill is the fourth album by American composer Bill Laswell to be issued under the moniker Divination. It was released in 1996 by Sub Meta.

Track listing

Personnel 
Adapted from the Distill liner notes.

Musicians
Knox Chandler – guitar (2.2)
Anton Fier – instruments and producer (2.2), mastering
Mick Harris – instruments and producer (1.4)
Haruomi Hosono – instruments and producer (1.3)
Tetsu Inoue – instruments and producer (2.3)
Thomas Köner – instruments and producer (2.1)
Bill Laswell – instruments and producer  (2.4)
Pete Namlook – instruments and producer (1.2)
Paul Schütze – instruments and producer (1.1)

Technical
Bruce Calder – engineering (2.2)
Robert Musso – engineering (2.4), mastering
Aldo Sampieri – design

Release history

References

External links 
 
 Distill at Bandcamp

1996 albums
Bill Laswell albums
Albums produced by Anton Fier
Albums produced by Mick Harris
Albums produced by Haruomi Hosono
Albums produced by Tetsu Inoue
Albums produced by Thomas Köner
Albums produced by Bill Laswell
Albums produced by Pete Namlook
Albums produced by Paul Schütze